Shamsul Ulama Islamic Academy is an Islamic educational institution in Kerala, India, established by the SKSSF Wayanad District Committee under the presidency of late District Qasi Panakkad Sayed Umerali Shihab Thangal in the year 2002 to promote Islamic educational activities. SUIA is managed by president Sayed Hyderali Shihab Thangal Panakkad.

It is one of the most important educational institution in Wayanad.

Location
The academy is located at Vengappally , Puzhamudi P.O., near Kalpetta, Wayanad

Website
www.wayanadacademy.org

References

Schools in Wayanad district
Kalpetta area
Institutes of higher Islamic learning in Kerala